William B. Talbott (1812 – September 5, 1899) was an English soldier who served in the Union Navy of the United States during the American Civil War. He received the Medal of Honor for valor.

Medal of Honor citation

Citation:

Served as captain of the forecastle on board the U.S.S. Louisville at the capture of the Arkansas post, 10 and 11 January 1863. Carrying out his duties as captain of a 9 inch gun, Talbott was conspicuous for ability and bravery throughout this engagement with the enemy.

See also

List of American Civil War Medal of Honor recipients: T-Z

References

External links

Military Times

1812 births
1899 deaths
United States Navy Medal of Honor recipients
American Civil War recipients of the Medal of Honor
Date of death unknown